Miltochrista zebrina is a moth of the family Erebidae first described by Frederic Moore in 1878. It is found in Bhutan and India (Calcutta).

References

zebrina
Moths described in 1878
Moths of Asia